The Kingston Times is a weekly newspaper published in Kingston, New York by Ulster Publishing.  After starting out as a monthly supplement to the Woodstock Times, the Kingston Times became its own weekly in 2004 and is distributed in the city and town of Kingston, New York and the town of Ulster, New York.

External links

References 

Daily newspapers published in New York (state)
Mass media in Ulster County, New York
Kingston, New York